The 2019 Western Athletic Conference men's soccer season will be the 37th season of men's varsity soccer in the conference. The regular season will begin on August 30, 2019 and conclude on November 2, 2019.

The regular season will culminate with the 2019 WAC Men's Soccer Tournament, which will begin on November 8 and conclude on November 16, 2019.

Background 
The 2018 season began in August 2018 and concluded in November 2018. Regular season champions, Air Force, enjoyed their best regular season ever, and their best NCAA Tournament berth since 1993. Air Force finished the season ranked 12th in the nation, and achieved a 17–5–0 record. In the 2018 WAC Men's Soccer Tournament, Air Force were eliminated by eventual tournament champions, Grand Canyon. Both teams earned berths into the 2018 NCAA Division I Men's Soccer Tournament, being the two WAC representatives in the tournament.

In the NCAA Tournament, Grand Canyon was eliminated on penalty kicks by UC Irvine in the first round. Air Force defeated Central Arkansas, 4–0 in the first round. In the second round, they played against in-state rivals, Denver, where they won 2–1. In the Sweet Sixteen, Air Force traveled out east to take on Indiana, where they lost 2–0. Indiana would end being the national runners-up.

At the end of the season, Air Force's Tucker Bone was named an Consensus All-American by earned first-team All-American honors by 	College Soccer News, Top Drawer Soccer, Soccer America, and United Soccer Coaches. Bone was the highest drafted WAC player selected in the 2019 MLS SuperDraft, being drafted in the first round, twentieth overall by Seattle Sounders. Three other WAC players were drafted in the 2019 SuperDraft: Camden Riley (Sporting Kansas City), Nathan Aune (San Jose Earthquakes), and Mitch Osmond (Minnesota United).

Teams
A total of 12 teams are due to take part in the conference this season.

On July 1, 2019, the University of Missouri–Kansas City announced that its athletic program, previously known as the UMKC Kangaroos, would be rebranded as the Kansas City Roos, with "Roos" having long been used as a short form of the historic "Kangaroos" nickname.

The 2019 season will be the last for both CSU Bakersfield and Kansas City as WAC members. On July 1, 2020, CSU Bakersfield will join the Big West Conference and Kansas City will return to the Summit League after a seven-year absence.

Stadiums and locations

Head coaches

Preseason

Preseason poll 
The preseason poll was released on August 21, 2019.

Preseason national polls 
The preseason national polls were released in July and August 2019.

Preseason awards 

Listed in the order that they were released

Regular season

Early season tournaments

Conference results

Postseason

WAC Tournament

NCAA Tournament 

The NCAA Tournament will begin in November 2019 and conclude on December 17, 2019.

Rankings

National rankings

Regional rankings 

The Far West region of the United Soccer poll ranks teams across the Pac-12, WAC, and Big West.

Awards and honors

Preseason honors

Postseason honors

2020 MLS Draft

The 2020 MLS SuperDraft will be held in January 2020.

Total picks by school

List of selections

Homegrown players 

The Homegrown Player Rule is a Major League Soccer program that allows MLS teams to sign local players from their own development academies directly to MLS first team rosters. Before the creation of the rule in 2008, every player entering Major League Soccer had to be assigned through one of the existing MLS player allocation processes, such as the MLS SuperDraft.

To place a player on its homegrown player list, making him eligible to sign as a homegrown player, players must have resided in that club's home territory and participated in the club's youth development system for at least one year. Players can play college soccer and still be eligible to sign a homegrown contract.

References

External links 
 WAC Men's Soccer

 
2019 NCAA Division I men's soccer season